The Handley-Knight (as it was originally known) was an automobile built in Kalamazoo, Michigan by Handley Motors Incorporated from 1921 to 1923.  From its inception to early 1923, it used the sleeve valve four-cylinder Knight engine.  Thereafter, the Models 6/60 and the 6/40, used the Midwest and Falls six-cylinder engines.  On both models, small handle attachments (or loops) encircled the upper sections of the headlamps and helped enthusiasts to recognize the vehicles.  Their motto was, "If it carries handles, it's a Handley".  The Checker Cab company bought the Handley interests in May 1923.

References
 

Defunct motor vehicle manufacturers of the United States
Motor vehicle manufacturers based in Michigan
Companies based in Kalamazoo, Michigan
Defunct manufacturing companies based in Michigan